The Clairvoyants (Thommy Ten and Amélie van Tass) are an Austrian magician and mentalist duo. The two of them have been performing together since 2011. They finished runner-up to Grace VanderWaal on season 11 of America's Got Talent.

References

External links

Austrian magicians
Year of birth missing (living people)
Living people
America's Got Talent contestants
Magician duos